The Diocese of Tiflis was a short-lived (1329–56) Roman Catholic bishopric in Transcaucasia, with see in present Tbilisi (capital of Georgia), which was suppressed but turned into a Latin titular see until its ultimate suppression.

History 
Established on 1329.08.09 as Diocese of Tiflis / Latin Tephlisen(sis) or Tiphlitana, without direct precursor. No residential incumbent(s?)  available.

Suppressed in 1356 without direct successor, but immediately turned into a Latin Titular bishopric of the same name, Tiflis.

Suppressed again circa 1800, even as titular see, having had the following incumbents, of the fitting Episcopal (lowest) rank with a single archiepiscopal exception, also the only secular priest :
 Heinrich Vuyst, Friars Minor (O.F.M.) (1462.12.31 – death 1468) as Auxiliary Bishop of Paderborn (Germany) (1462.12.31 – 1468)
 Johannes Ymminck, Augustinians (O.E.S.A.) (1469.07.10 – 1493.04.14), first as Auxiliary Bishop of above Paderborn (Germany) (1469.07.10 – 1472), then as Auxiliary Bishop of Münster (western Germany) (1472 – retired 1484); died 1493
 Albert Engel, O.F.M. (1493.04.18 – death 1500.11.18) as Auxiliary Bishop of above Paderborn (Germany) (1493.04.18 – 1500.11.18)
 Johannes Schneider, O.F.M. (1507.04.19 – death 1551.03.27) as Auxiliary Bishop of Wien (Vienna, Austria) (1896.06.25 – 1905.01.26)
 Titular Archbishop Stephanus Autandil (1785.05.24 – death 1794.12.06), no actual prelature.

Sources and external links 
 GCatholic - data for all sections

Catholic titular sees in Europe